The 1976–77 North American Hockey League season was the fourth and final season of the North American Hockey League. Eight teams participated in the regular season, and the Syracuse Blazers were the league champions.

Regular season

Lockhart Cup-Playoffs

External links
 Statistics on hockeydb.com

North American Hockey League (1973–1977) seasons
NAHL
NAHL